On Velvet is a 1938 British musical comedy film directed by Widgey R. Newman and starring Wally Patch, Joe Hayman and Vi Kaley. It is a musical revue and was distributed by the American company Columbia Pictures.

Cast
 Wally Patch as Harry Higgs  
 Joe Hayman as Sam Cohen  
 Vi Kaley as Mrs. Higgs  
 Mildred Franklin as Mrs. Cohen  
 Helga & Joe as Duo Act  
 Jennifer Skinner as Mary  
 Leslie Bradley as Monty  
 Ambrose Day as Waterbury  
 Nina Mae McKinney as Singer  
 Julie Suedo as Singer  
 Gordon Little 
 Eric Barker 
 Collinson & Dean as Performers  
 Mark Stone as Mark  
 Rex Burrows as Orchestra Leader 
 Olive Delmer 
 Cleo Fauvel 
 Robert Field 
 Queenie Lucy
 Sydney Moncton 
 Andrée Sacré 
 George Sims 
 Garland Wilson

References

Bibliography
 Low, Rachael. Filmmaking in 1930s Britain. George Allen & Unwin, 1985.
 Wood, Linda. British Films, 1927-1939. British Film Institute, 1986.

External links

1938 films
British musical comedy films
1938 musical comedy films
Films directed by Widgey R. Newman
Columbia Pictures films
British black-and-white films
Quota quickies
1930s English-language films
1930s British films